Sarat Chandra Goswami (1887-1944) was a prominent writer of Assam who enriched the Assamese literature with his short stories. Goswami was a founder member of Asam Sahitya Sabha and elected as a Secretary of the Sabha for the first time. He continued in the same post from 1920 to 1927.

Early life and education
Goswami was born on 12 May 1887 at Narayanpur Sattra (now Nalbari Sattra) in Nalbari district of Assam. His father Lalit Chandra Goswami was also a writer and known for his "Keli Rohoishyo" book.

He had his early education in his own residence under Matiram Das, a private teacher and was finally admitted in a M.V. School in 1897. Thereafter he was admitted to Cotton Collegiate School and then in Cotton college, Guwahati. He took his F.A. and B.A. degrees from the Calcutta Metropolitan College (now Vidyasagar College). After completion of B.A. he took admission in Calcutta University in M.A. classes having honours in Sanskrit language.

Career
In 1909, he was appointed temporarily as a Deputy Inspector at Nagaon. After that he served in some posts like Assistant Inspector, Superintendent, Inspector etc. in different places of Assam under the education department of Assam.

Literary works
Some of Goswami's literary works include:

See also
 Assamese literature
 List of Asam Sahitya Sabha presidents
 List of people from Assam
 List of Assamese-language poets
 List of Assamese writers with their pen names

References

Writers from Assam
1887 births
1940 deaths
People from Nalbari district
Cotton College, Guwahati alumni
Vidyasagar College alumni
University of Calcutta alumni
20th-century Indian short story writers
19th-century Indian short story writers
Writers in British India